Robert Lips (21 August 1912 – 28 February 1975), was a Swiss cartoonist. He is best known as the creator of the cartoon character Globi for
Globus. He was also a fencer and competed in the individual and team épée events at the 1948 Summer Olympics.

References

1912 births
1975 deaths
Artists from Zürich
Swiss cartoonists
Swiss comics artists
Swiss comics writers
Swiss male épée fencers
Olympic fencers of Switzerland
Fencers at the 1948 Summer Olympics
Sportspeople from Zürich
Olympic competitors in art competitions